Đức Cơ  is a district (huyện) of Gia Lai province in the Central Highlands region of Vietnam.

As of 2003 the district had a population of 49,745. The district covers an area of 717 km². The district capital lies at Chư Ty.

References

Districts of Gia Lai province